Ammonium hydrosulfide is the chemical compound with the formula .

Composition
It is the salt derived from the ammonium cation and the hydrosulfide anion. The salt exists as colourless, water-soluble, micaceous crystals. On Earth the compound is encountered mainly as a solution, not as the solid, but  ice is believed to be a substantial component of the cloud decks of the gas-giant planets Jupiter and Saturn, with sulfur produced by its photolysis responsible for the color of some of those planets' clouds. It can be generated by mixing hydrogen sulfide and ammonia.

Preparation
Solutions of ammonium hydrosulfide can be prepared by passing hydrogen sulfide gas through concentrated ammonia solution. According to a detailed 1895 report, hydrogen sulfide reacts with concentrated aqueous ammonia solution at room temperature to give . When this species is cooled to 0 °C and treated with additional hydrogen sulfide, one obtains . An ice-cold solution of this substance kept at 0 °C and having hydrogen sulfide continually passed through it gives the hydrosulfide.

The common "stink bomb" consists of an aqueous solution of ammonium sulfide. The mixture easily converts to ammonia and hydrogen sulfide gases. This conversion illustrates the ease of the following equilibrium:

Ammonia and hydrogen sulfide each have a powerful and unpleasant smell.

"Ammonium sulfide"

Ammonium sulfide solutions are used occasionally in photographic developing, to apply patina to bronze, and in textile manufacturing. It can be used as a selective reducing agent (cf. 2,4-dinitrochlorobenzene); where there are two nitro groups, only one of them is selectively reduced.

The 1990-1991 CRC Handbook of Chemistry and Physics gives information for anhydrous ammonium monosulfide and ammonium pentasulfide as separate from anhydrous ammonium hydrosulfide, describing the former two both as yellow crystalline substances that are soluble in cold water and alcohol, and which both decompose in hot water or at high temperature in general (115°C for the pentasulfide), but the latter as a white crystalline solid (which also decomposes in hot water). Thus, it seems that solid ammonium sulfide can be distinct from solid ammonium hydrosulfide, even if this is not true in aqueous solution.

References

Ammonium compounds
Hydrosulfides